Alexander Campbell "Cam" McPherson (born 24 May 1940) is a former Australian rules footballer who played for Hawthorn in the Victorian Football League (VFL).

A half back flanker from Shepparton, McPherson played over 100 games for Hawthorn and was a member of the club's first-ever premiership side.

External links

1940 births
Australian rules footballers from Victoria (Australia)
Hawthorn Football Club players
Hawthorn Football Club Premiership players
Shepparton Football Club players
Living people
People from Shepparton
One-time VFL/AFL Premiership players